Scream of the Wolf is a 1974 American made-for-television horror-thriller film starring Peter Graves and Clint Walker and directed by Dan Curtis. It originally aired as the ABC Movie of the Week on January 16, 1974.

Plot
Following a series of brutal murders committed by what appears to be an animal, Sheriff Vernon Bell asks local adventure writer and former hunter John Weatherby to investigate. Weatherby agrees and finds that the footprints left at the murder site appear to be that of a wolf, but that changed into a bipedal animal while leaving, and the animal has left no scent. Weatherby asks his friend, reclusive big game hunter Byron Douglas, for help, but he declines, stating that he feels the atmosphere of fear the killings create has made the townsfolk "alive" for the first time. Byron and Weatherby had previously gone on a hunt where they battled a vicious wolf that had bitten Byron.

Weatherby's girlfriend Sandy is attacked in her home by the animal. She survives, but begins to believe the murders were committed by a werewolf, a belief that spreads to the rest of the townsfolk. Sandy also believes that Byron could be the killer, as does Sheriff Bell, who posts a police officer to stakeout Byron's house. The officer is mauled to death, and his body is found in a clearing far away from the house. After the town is put into a state of national emergency, Weatherby demands Byron's help once more, and he reluctantly agrees. The two hunt for the animal in the woods, splitting up. Byron is seemingly killed by the animal, which John tracks to Byron's house. John is held at gunpoint by Byron, who faked his own death by killing his assistant Grant.

Byron reveals that he was the killer, having faked the tracks with pieces of the animals he has killed over the years and covered his scent, and used an attack dog to kill the victims. Byron wants to hunt Weatherby and help him regain his killer instincts, and sends him out into the woods with a five-minute head start to find ammo for his rifle. Weatherby succeeds but is attacked by the dog, which he shoots. Byron then attacks him, only for Weatherby to reveal he had hidden a pistol, having known Byron was the killer and baited him into revealing himself. Byron walks away, only to be shot and wounded by Weatherby. Enraged, Byron rushes after him, only to be shot again and killed. Weatherby stands over his friend's body, contemplating what he has done, and then walks off into the night.

Cast
Peter Graves - John Weatherby 
Clint Walker - Byron Douglas 
Jo Ann Pflug - Sandy Miller 
Philip Carey - Sheriff Vernon Bell 
Don Megowan - Grant
Dean Smith as Lake

Release
The film originally aired on the American Broadcasting Company (ABC) on January 16, 1974.

The film is available on DVD via several public domain companies.

See also
 List of American films of 1974

References

External links

 
 

1974 television films
1974 films
1974 horror films
1970s horror thriller films
American horror television films
American horror thriller films
Films directed by Dan Curtis
Films with screenplays by Richard Matheson
American supernatural horror films
American werewolf films
1970s supernatural horror films
1970s English-language films
1970s American films